Although the politics of Jersey has been largely based on independent parliamentary representatives, from time to time the island has had political parties. There are currently 4 active political parties in the island.

In 2000, the Clothier report noted that "over the centuries Jersey has had many parties, by which one means only a coming together of like minds to achieve a particular objective. Once achieved, the binding purpose has disappeared and the group pursuing it has dissolved. Such a grouping is not a true political party because it lacks the cement of a common philosophy of government, having only a narrow objective to hold it together until the objective is either attained or lost". Various parties have been formed over the years in Jersey, but since the 1950s the majority of candidates have stood for election unaffiliated to any political party.

Current parties

History

18th century 
Historically, two parties dominated Jersey politics. Originating in the 1770s, the Jeannot party formed around the radical lawyer and Connétable, Jean Dumaresq, who opposed the cabal of Jurats who surrounded Lieutenant-Bailiff Charles Lemprière (whose supporters became known as the Charlot party). The Jeannots rapidly adopted the nickname of Magots (cheese mites) after their opponents boasted of aiming to crush them like mites.

Dumaresq believed in political reform and was an early example of a Liberal. He believed in democratic reform - that the States should have vested in them executive power and should be composed democratically elected Deputies.:200

19th century 

After the Napoleonic Wars, the parties were still existent. St Ouen provided each party with an emblem and a name: the Charlots (the Conservatives, sporting a rose) and the Magots (the Progressives, sporting a laurel leaf).:231

The symbolism soon became entrenched to the extent that gardens displayed their owners' allegiances, and pink or green paintwork also showed political sympathies. Still today in Jersey, the presence of established laurels or rose gardens in old houses gives a clue to the past party adherence of former owners, and the chair of the Constable of Saint Helier in the Assembly Room of the Parish Hall still sports the carved roses of a former incumbent.

In order to help control voting in Jersey, it was not unknown for citizens to find themselves taken and stranded on the Écréhous until after voting had taken place. By the time of the introduction of the secret ballot in 1891, party politics had waned.

Blues and Reds contested local elections into the 1920s, but Islandwide party politics lay dormant until the post-Occupation elections under the new Constitution of 1948.

After the Occupation 

The first election under the new constitution saw a struggle for dominance between the Jersey Democratic Movement and the Jersey Progressive Party, led by Cyril Le Marquand. Having achieved the political reforms it advocated the Progressive Party soon folded as an organisation, while the Democratic Movement, incorporating the tiny Communist Party of Jersey, continued in existence as a campaigning social movement until the late 20th century.

After the 2005 constitutional reforms 
The prospect of ministerial government and the creation of an executive and opposition, led to the formation of two political parties – the Jersey Democratic Alliance and the Centre Party – in preparation for the 2005 elections. A group called "Elect Jersey 2005" worked to assist some independent candidates prepare for the elections. None of the party-affiliated candidates was successful in the October senatorial elections; three JDA members standing as independents were elected as deputies in November 2005 along with two members of the Centre Party who had similarly stood as independents. The Centre Party was wound up in 2007.

In 2008, legislation was passed to require registration of political parties who wished to endorse candidates for election as a senator, deputy or Connétable.

In the 2008 elections for senators, the JDA fielded two candidates, two candidates stood as members of the campaign group "Jersey 2020" (focusing on environmental issues) and two for "Time4Change/Reform": none was successful. In the subsequent deputies' elections, four JDA candidates were successful, but three of them subsequently left the party and continued to sit as independents. In August 2011, the JDA announced that party members would stand only as independents in the October 2011 elections. A branch of the 'Liberal Democrats Abroad' was formed in the island in November 2011.

On 4 July 2014, Reform Jersey became Jersey's only political party when it was registered in the Royal Court. The party contested the 2014 general election where 3 of their 8 candidates were elected. In 2021, another political party, the Progress Party, was registered. In 2020, the Jersey Liberal Conservatives was registered.

Former parties 
 Jeannot party (Magots) (emerged 1780s)
 Charlot party (emerged 1780s)
 Rose party (formerly Jeannots) (formed 1819)
 Laurel party (formerly Charlots) (formed 1819)
 Jersey Labour Party (active 1940s)
 Jersey Progressive Party (active 1940s)
 Jersey Democratic Movement (active 1940s-1990s)
 Jersey Green Party (Senator Stuart Syvret; Geraint Jennings) (1980s-2005)
 Jersey Democratic Alliance (formed 2005)
 Centre Party (2005-2007)
 Jersey Conservative Party (formed 2007)
 Liberal Democrats (Jersey 'Liberal Democrats Abroad' branch formed in November 2011)

See also
 Politics of Jersey
 List of political parties by country

References

Politics of Jersey
 
Political parties
Political parties